Leak detector may refer to:
 Leak noise correlator
 Helium mass spectrometer
 Water detector
 Gas detector